Major General Evelyn Edward Thomas Boscawen, 7th Viscount Falmouth,  (24 July 1847 – 1 October 1918) was a British peer and British Army officer.

Military career
Boscawen was commissioned into the Coldstream Guards: he played cricket for the Household Brigade and then for the 1st Battalion Coldstream Guards. He fought in the Anglo-Egyptian War in 1882 and, having been promoted to colonel in 1886, he also took part in the Nile Expedition between 1884 and 1885. He was promoted to major-general in 1898 and became Assistant Military Secretary to the Commander-in-Chief, Ireland in 1900. He was appointed a deputy lieutenant of Kent on 8 January 1900, and of Cornwall on 19 March. He retired from the army on 9 August 1902.

Boscawen succeeded to the title of 7th Viscount Falmouth on 6 November 1889.

Family
He married the Hon. Kathleen Douglas-Pennant, eldest daughter of Lord Penrhyn, on 19 October 1886 at St Paul's Church, Knightsbridge Their daughter, Kathleen Pamela Mary Corona (1902–1995), the actress known by the stage name Pamela Carme, married theatrical manager Henry Sherek.

According to Lady Randolph Churchill's sisters, he might have had a liaison with her, and might have been the biological father of John Strange Spencer-Churchill, the younger brother of Winston Churchill.

References

Sources

 Mosley, Charles, editor. Burke's Peerage, Baronetage & Knightage, 107th edition, 3 volumes. Wilmington, Delaware, U.S.A.: Burke's Peerage (Genealogical Books) Ltd, 2003

1847 births
1918 deaths
Barons le Despencer
Evelyn
British Army major generals
Coldstream Guards officers
Companions of the Order of the Bath
Deputy Lieutenants of Cornwall
Deputy Lieutenants of Kent
Knights Commander of the Royal Victorian Order
Viscounts in the Peerage of Great Britain